Michael R. Crider is an Indiana politician who has represented District 28 of the Indiana Senate since 2012, currently serving as the Majority Whip. He previously served as Director of Law Enforcement for the Indiana Department of Natural Resources from 2006 to 2010. Crider ran for the Republican nomination for Indiana's 6th congressional district in 2018, but he dropped out in December 2017.

Education 
Crider graduated from the Indiana Law Enforcement Academy in 1981, and the FBI National Academy in 2003.

Career 
Crider has introduced legislation to regulate ownership of large predatory animals multiple times.

In 2021, he authored legislation that now allows mental health professionals to "diagnose and refer an individual to start mental health treatment." The National Association of Social Workers’ Indiana Chapter awarded Crider their 2021 Public Elected Official of the Year Award for his work on the bill. He was also awarded a 2021 Conservation Champion Award from the Indiana Wildlife Federation for his "efforts at the statehouse to keep our parks and outdoor recreation areas accessible for all Hoosiers."

Committees 

 Homeland Security and Transportation, Chair
 Veterans Affairs and the Military, Ranking Member
 Appropriations
 Health and Provider Services
 Rules and Legislative Procedure

Personal life 
Crider is married to his wife Sherri and has two children and six grandchildren.

References

External links 
Michael Crider at Ballotpedia
Project Vote Smart – Senator Michael Crider (IN) profile
Our Campaigns – Senator Michael Crider (IN) profile
State Senate Website

Living people
Republican Party Indiana state senators
21st-century American politicians
Year of birth missing (living people)